Ovtsyno is a rural locality (a village) in Golovinskoye Rural Settlement, Sudogodsky District, Vladimir Oblast, Russia. The population was 109 as of 2010. There are 4 streets.

Geography 
Ovtsyno is located on the Soyma River, 15 km northwest of Sudogda (the district's administrative centre) by road. Khokhlachi is the nearest rural locality.

References 

Rural localities in Sudogodsky District